The Musical Comedy Crime is a 1933 mystery detective novel by Anthony Gilbert, the pen name of British writer Lucy Beatrice Malleson. It is the seventh entry of the series featuring Scott Egerton, her principal character before her better known creation Arthur Crook appeared three years later. A traditional whodunnit, it was published during the Golden Age of Detective Fiction.

Synopsis
Major John Hillier is killed in his London flat by his servant. Inspector Field of Scotland Yard traced his movements the night before his death and found he had attended a performance at a suburban theatre. It takes Scott Egerton to finally crack the case.

References

Bibliography
 Iwaschkin, Roman.  Popular Music: A Reference Guide. Routledge, 2016.
 Magill, Frank Northen . Critical Survey of Mystery and Detective Fiction: Authors, Volume 2. Salem Press, 1988.
Murphy, Bruce F. The Encyclopedia of Murder and Mystery. Springer, 1999.
 Reilly, John M. Twentieth Century Crime & Mystery Writers. Springer, 2015.

1933 British novels
British mystery novels
British thriller novels
Novels by Anthony Gilbert
Novels set in London
British detective novels
Collins Crime Club books